Screaming Mimi is a 1958 American film noir directed by Gerd Oswald and starring Anita Ekberg, Philip Carey and Gypsy Rose Lee. The story originated as a 1949 novel of the same name by Fredric Brown.

Plot
In Southern California, while Virginia Wilson is taking an outside beach shower, an escaped madman from a sanitarium arrives. He stabs her dog, attacks her and is shot to death by her stepbrother, Charlie, with a rifle.

After the attack, Virginia is committed to a sanitarium. The psychiatrist falls in love with her. He fakes her death, and they go on the lam. Virginia ends up dancing at El Madhouse night club run by Gypsy Rose Lee. Lee performs "Put the Blame on Mame," the classic noir theme from the 1946 film Gilda.

All the while, Virginia is being stalked by a serial killer.

Cast
 Anita Ekberg as Virginia Wilson / Yolanda Lange
 Philip Carey as Bill Sweeney
 Gypsy Rose Lee as Joann 'Gypsy' Mapes
 Harry Townes as Dr. Greenwood / Bill Green
 Linda Cherney as Ketti
 Romney Brent as Charlie Weston
 Red Norvo as Red Yost (as The Red Norvo Trio)
 Frank J. Scannell as Paul the Bartender

Reception
Richard W. Nason, film critic for The New York Times, wrote, "It is an effective film of its kind, thanks to some reflective dialogue by Robert Blees and a sense of suspense on the part of Gerd Oswald, the director. Anita Ekberg, who does more acting here than before, is the star. Gypsy Rose Lee and Phil Carey are also on the ball."

Film critic Dennis Schwartz gave the film a C, describing the direction as lackluster and the story as so nonsensical that it entirely cripples the film. He summarized it as "a delusional film that seems fit for fetishists, voyeurs, those seeking a lurid oddball film with innovative noirish B/W photography by the great Burnett Guffey and, is especially suited, for lovers of bad-movies."

See also
 List of American films of 1958

References

External links
 
 
 
 
 Screaming Mimi informational site and DVD review at DVD Beaver (includes images)
 Screaming Mimi essay by Jeff Stafford at Turner Classic Movies
 
 

1958 films
1950s psychological thriller films
1950s mystery films
American psychological thriller films
American mystery films
1950s English-language films
Films directed by Gerd Oswald
American black-and-white films
Columbia Pictures films
Film noir
Films based on American novels
Films based on thriller novels
1950s American films